Philippsburg is a town in Baden-Württemberg, Germany.

Philippsburg may also refer to:

Places
 Philippsbourg, French municipality in the Department of Moselle (German name: Philippsburg)
 a fictitious town in Martin Walser's novel Ehen in Philippsburg

Buildings
 Philippsburg Fortress in Philippsburg, Germany
 Philippsburg Nuclear Power Station near Philippsburg
 Philippsburg (Leer), a manor house in East Frisia, Germany
 Löwenburg and Philippsburg, ruined castles in Monreal, Germany

See also
 Philipsburg (disambiguation)
 Phillipsburg (disambiguation)